The 2004 European Women Sevens Championship – the second edition of the European Women's Sevens Championship. It took place between the 21 and 22 May 2004 at Limoges.

It was England who take home the first European Women's Sevens Championship after defeating Italy 38-7.Fira-Aer

Pool Stage

Pool A

Pool B

France 48-0 Norway
Portugal 59-0 Bosnia-Herzegovina
France 58-0 Bosnia-Herzegovina
Portugal 27-5 Norway
Norway 15-0 Bosnia-Herzegovina
France 32-0 Portugal

Pool C

England 47-0 Czech Republic
Italy 40-0 Lithuania
England 52-0 Lithuania
Italy 40-0 Czech Republic
Czech Republic 0-21 Lithuania
England 35-7 Italy

Pool D

Switzerland 33-12 Bulgaria
Sweden 28-0 Poland
Switzerland 17-0 Poland
Sweden 31-0 Bulgaria
Bulgaria 12-12 Poland
Switzerland 0-7 Sweden

Classification Stages 
9th-16th Quarter-finals
Limosin 41-0 Bosnia-Herzegovina
Poland 0-7 Czech Republic (AET)
Lithuania 40-0 Bulgaria
Norway 0-7 Belgium (AET)
13th-16th Semi-finals
Bosnia-Herzegovina 0-66 Poland
Bulgaria 0-14 Norway
9th-12th Semi-finals
Limousin 32-12 Czech Republic
Lithuania 21-0 Belgium
1st-8th Quarter-finals
Spain 7-0 Portugal
Sweden 14-21 Italy
England 31-0 Switzerland
France 51-0 Croatia
5th-8th Semi-finals
Portugal 0-28 Sweden 
Switzerland 27-0 Croatia
1st-4th Semi-finals
Spain 7-22 Italy
England 33-0 France
Finals

15th/16th Final
Bosnia-Herzegovina 0-19 Bulgaria
13th/14th Final 
Poland 33-17 Norway
11th/12th Final
Czech Republic 0-14 Belgium
9th/10th Final 
Limousin 7-29 Lithuania
7th/8th Final
Portugal 0-5 Croatia
5th/6th Final 
Sweden 7-12 Switzerland
3rd/4th Final
Spain 14-27 France
1st/2nd Final 
Italy 7-38 England

References

2004
2004 rugby sevens competitions
sevens
2003–04 in French rugby union
International women's rugby union competitions hosted by France
rugby union